Gonçales da Silva Felix (born 3 June 1985) is a former professional footballer. He played as a defensive midfielder. He made one Ligue 2 appearance for Niort in the 2004–05 season.

External links
Gonçales da Silva Felix profile at chamoisfc79.fr

1985 births
Living people
Brazilian footballers
Association football midfielders
Chamois Niortais F.C. players
Ligue 2 players